BioImage was established in 1993 as a drug discovery research unit within Novo Nordisk. The research unit was led by Ole Thastrup and spun out of Novo Nordisk in 1999.

BioImage specializes in developing and selling proprietary bioassays to biopharmaceutical companies and research institutions.  It also develops bioassays on a contract service basis.

BioImage has made broad patents covering Enhanced GFP (EGFP), GFP-based biosensors and any genetically encoded protein fusion to a luminophore, with subsequent monitoring of the protein's translocation within a cell as the primary readout for drug discovery assays.  This intellectual property, trademarked Redistribution, allows many collaborations and out-licensing activities with biopharmaceutical companies.

Merger 

In April 2006, BioImage was acquired by Thermo Fisher Scientific. The merger was complete in November 2006, and technology transfer to a US site was completed during 2007 and 2008.

References 

Research support companies
Biotechnology companies of Denmark
Companies based in Gladsaxe Municipality